Kevin Collins may refer to:

Kevin Collins (American actor) (born 1972), American actor in theatre, film, television and radio drama
Kevin Andrew Collins (born 1974), child abducted from San Francisco in 1984
Kevin Collins (General Hospital), fictional character on the American soap opera General Hospital and its spin-off Port Charles
Kevin Collins (baseball) (1946–2016), American Major League Baseball player
Kevin Collins (bridge) American bridge player
Kevin Collins (cricketer) (born 1954), New Zealand cricketer
Kevin Collins (footballer) (born 1922), Australian rules footballer
Kevin Collins (ice hockey) (born 1950), retired National Hockey League linesman
Kevin J. Collins (born 1970), American political consultant
Kevin Collins, a variant of the Tom Collins cocktail

Collins, Kevin